A general election was held in the U.S. state of Oregon on November 8, 2016. Primary elections were held on May 17, 2016.

Federal

President of the United States

Hillary Clinton won the state's 7 electoral votes.

United States House of Representatives

All five of Oregon's seats in the United States House of Representatives were up for re-election in 2016. All five incumbents, four Democrats and one Republican, won re-election.

United States Senate

Incumbent Democratic senior Senator Ron Wyden won re-election to a fourth full term in office.

Attorney General
Incumbent attorney general Ellen Rosenblum (D) was re-elected.

Democratic primary
 Ellen Rosenblum, incumbent attorney general

Results

Republican primary
 Daniel Zene Crowe, lawyer

Results

Independent Party primary
No Independent Party candidates filed to run in the primary.

Results

General Election

Governor

This election determined who fills the remaining two years of the term of Democratic governor John Kitzhaber, who was re-elected in 2014 and resigned in 2015. The incumbent governor is Democrat Kate Brown, who succeeded to the governor's office as Oregon Secretary of State. Brown won re-election; the next gubernatorial election is in 2018.

Secretary of State

Incumbent Democratic Secretary of State Jeanne Atkins declined to seek election; she was appointed in March 2015 following Kate Brown's ascension to the governorship.

Dennis Richardson (R) defeated Brad Avakian (D), to become the first Republican to win a statewide election in Oregon since 2002

Democratic primary
 Brad Avakian, Oregon Commissioner of Labor and Industries, former state senator and Representative
 Richard Devlin, state senator and former state representative
 Val Hoyle, state representative

Results

Republican primary
 Sid Leiken, Lane County Commissioner
 Dennis Richardson, former state representative

Results

Independent Party primary
 Paul Damian Wells, machinist and perennial candidate

Results

Other candidates
 Sharon Durbin, candidate for U.S. House District 2 in 2014 (Libertarian)
 Michael P. Marsh, perennial candidate (Constitution)
 Alan Zundel, former political scientist and former professor at the University of Nevada, Las Vegas (Pacific Green)

General election

Endorsements

Polling

General Election

State Treasurer

Incumbent treasurer Ted Wheeler (D) is term-limited and successfully ran for mayor of Portland. Tobias Read (D) was elected to succeed him.

Legislative

The Democrats have an 18–12 majority in the Oregon State Senate in the previous session. Of 30 Senate seats, 16 were up for election. In the Oregon House of Representatives, in which Democrats hold a 35–25 majority, all 60 seats were up for election.

Ballot measures
There were seven statewide Oregon ballot measures on the November 2016 ballot:
 
 Measure 94 — Amends Constitution: Eliminates mandatory retirement age for state judges
 Measure 95 — Amends Constitution: Allows investments in equities by public universities to reduce financial risk and increase investments to benefit students
 Measure 96 — Amends Constitution: Dedicates 1.5% of state lottery net proceeds to funding support services for Oregon veterans
 Measure 97 — Increases corporate minimum tax when sales exceed $25 million; funds education, healthcare, senior services 
 Measure 98 — Requires state funding for dropout-prevention, career and college readiness programs in Oregon high schools 
 Measure 99 — Creates "Outdoor School Education Fund," continuously funded through Lottery, to provide outdoor school programs statewide 
 Measure 100 — Prohibits purchase or sale of parts or products from certain wildlife species; exceptions; civil penalties

See also
 Elections in Oregon
 Portland, Oregon mayoral election, 2016

References

External links
 Elections Division at the Oregon Secretary of State
 Oregon at Ballotpedia

 
Oregon
Oregon elections by year